Sweet Rush may refer to:

Sweet rush, one of several names (beewort, calamus root, myrtle grass) for Acorus calamus
Sweet Rush, English title for Polish director Andrzej Wajda's Tatarak